The Heroes, also known as The Shaolin Heroes, is a 1980 Hong Kong martial arts film directed by Wu Ma and Pao Hsueh-li and starring Ti Lung, Shih Szu and Danny Lee.

Plot
During the Qing Dynasty, the imperial court views the righteous Shaolin Temple as an eyesore and sends a group of soldiers to destroy the temple, led by chief Ko Fei (Ti Lung), a former Shaolin disciple. After Shaolin was destroyed, all of its disciples were captured and detained. Although Ko made them work as hard labors, he was actually helping them increase their physical strength to refine their martial arts. On the surface, Ko seems to be working for the imperial court, but he was assisting his fellow disciples to recover Shaolin. However, his fellow disciples did not accept the token of his appreciation. Afterwards, the disciples fled and revolted before killing the Emperor (Michael Chan). At that time, Ko was also killed and his heroic deed was not known even after he died. Ko is considered a true hero who can tolerate the most insult and humiliation.

Cast
 Ti Lung as Ko Fei / Wong Fei
 Shih Szu as Princess
 Danny Lee as Righteous Monk
 Michael Chan as Qing Emperor
 Dorian Tan as Si Ying
 Wong Chung as Fong Gau
 Wong Ching as Gap toothed official
 Goo Chang as Bald official
 Wu Ma as Ng Ging
 Tsai Hung
 Lee Ho
 Joh Yau
 Chan Pik Fung
 Sit Hon as Abbot
 Wong Yeuk ping
 Ma King Shun
 Cho Boon Feng
 Lau Yau Bun
 Wong Kwok Fai
 Robert Tai
 Ko Chang Sheng

Theme song
 Hero (英雄)
 Composer: Joseph Koo
 Lyricist: Chang Cheh
 Singer: Jenny Tseng

Reception
J. Doyle Wallis of DVD Talk gave the film 4.5 out of 5 stars and a positive review praising it for having "one of the better plots in kung fu filmdom" as well as the action choreography and pacing.

References

External links
 
 The Heroes at Hong Kong Cinemagic
 

1980 films
1980 action films
1980 martial arts films
Hong Kong action films
Hong Kong martial arts films
Kung fu films
Wushu films
1980s Mandarin-language films
Films directed by Wu Ma
Films set in the Qing dynasty
1980s Hong Kong films